Corey Wayne Lee (born December 26, 1974) is a former Major League Baseball pitcher who played in one game for the Texas Rangers in 1999.

Amateur career
Lee played college baseball for North Carolina State University. In 1995 and 1996, he played collegiate summer baseball with the Falmouth Commodores of the Cape Cod Baseball League. He was selected by Texas in the first round of the 1996 MLB Draft.

Professional career
In his lone appearance in a major league uniform, Lee allowed 3 runs in 1 inning.

References

External links

1974 births
Living people
Texas Rangers players
Major League Baseball pitchers
Tucson Sidewinders players
Tacoma Rainiers players
Oklahoma RedHawks players
High Desert Mavericks players
Reno Aces players
American expatriate baseball players in Japan
Falmouth Commodores players
NC State Wolfpack baseball players
Arkansas Travelers players
Bridgeport Bluefish players
Charlotte Knights players
Hudson Valley Renegades players
Hokkaido Nippon-Ham Fighters players
Charlotte Rangers players
Salt Lake Stingers players
Tulsa Drillers players